The Saturn Award for Best Streaming Science Fiction, Action & Fantasy Series was presented once at the 45th Saturn Awards, honoring the best streaming series in the genres of science fiction, action and fantasy.

At the 47th Saturn Awards in 2022, the category was revived and split into three categories: Best Streaming Science Fiction Television Series, Best Streaming Action Adventure Television Series and Best Streaming Fantasy Television Series.

(NOTE: Year refers to year of eligibility, the actual ceremonies are held the following year)

Winners and Nominees

References

See also
 Saturn Award for Best Science Fiction Television Series
 Saturn Award for Best Action-Thriller Television Series
 Saturn Award for Best Fantasy Television Series
 Saturn Award for Best New Media Television Series

Saturn Awards